Northside High School is located in Columbus, Georgia, United States. It was founded in 2002. Originally, the mascot was planned to be the Wolverine, but after the September 11 attacks, the mascot was changed to the Patriot. They have outstanding programs like engineering and biomedical science. Northside High School also participates in many local fundraisers through their many clubs and organizations.

Activities

Athletics
Baseball
Boys'/girls' basketball
Cheerleading (competition and football)
Cross country
Drill team
Football
Boys'/girls' golf
Patriot Marching Band
JROTC Raiders
Rifle: 2005, 2006, and 2007 State Champions
Boys'/girls' Soccer
Softball
Swim Team
Boys'/girls' tennis team 
Boys'/girls' track and field
Volleyball
Wrestling: Area Champions 2005
Northside Patriots Marching Band

Clubs and organizations
Northside clubs and organizations include the following:

 Academic Decathlon
 Annual
 Art Club
 Astronomy Club
 BEST Robotics
 Concert Band
 DECA
 Dinner theater
 Engineering Honor Society
 FBLA
 FIRST Robotics Competition
 HOSA
 Jazz Band
 JROTC
 Literary magazine
 Madrigal dinner
 Marching Band
 Math Team
 Mock Trial
 Model United Nations
 Mu Alpha Theta
 National Honor Society
 National Technical Honor Society 
 Newspaper
 Northside Singers
 One Act Play
  Percussion Ensemble
 Poetry Club
 Science Honor Society
 Skills USA
 Spanish Club
 Speech/Debate Team
 Symphonic Band
 Technology Student Association

Publications
The yearbook is produced by students in the Yearbook class, a split class lasting all year. The school newspaper is written by the school's journalism class.  The literary magazine is written by the journalism class and select students who turn in their original work.

Amor Patriae, yearbook
The Patriot Reveille, newspaper
The Lantern, literature/art magazine

Notable alumni
Katherine Webb (Class of 2007)

References

External links
Northside High School

High schools in Columbus, Georgia
Public high schools in Georgia (U.S. state)